Afrikaaps could refer to the following:
Afrikaaps (language), South African language also known as Kaaps.
Afrikaaps (documentary), 2010 documentary.